The Courage LC70 is a Le Mans prototype of the LMP1 class developed by Courage Competition and used in sports car racing since 2006. In the meantime, however, Courage Compétition has been taken over by ORECA , so the original name Courage LC70 has been changed. The Courage-ORECA LC75 is almost identical in construction but was designed for the LMP2 class. Other modifications of the LC75 are the Acura ARX-01a and Acura ARX-01b, which has been used in the American Le Mans Series since 2007. The type designation LC stands for Lillian Courage, the wife of Yves Courage who died in 2004.

Racing history

The LC70 has been used since 2006 by Courage Compétition and ORECA itself, as well as teams such as Swiss Spirit and Saulnier Racing. In addition to being used in the 24 Hours of Le Mans, the chassis is primarily used in the Le Mans Series. The LC70, equipped with a Judd V10, made its racing debut in the hands of Swiss Spirit at 1000 km of Istanbul in 2006. Courage Competition itself relied on a brand new V8 unit from Mugen. In 2008, at the second round of the Le Mans Series in Monza, Stéphane Ortelli had a serious accident when his LC70 under-inflated before the first chicane and took off.

The LC70 was also successful on other continents. An LC70 used by Mugen was able to win the 1000 km of Okayama in the Japan Le Mans Challenge twice. The Courage chassis were also successful in North America, albeit modified LC75s under the Acura banner.

Achievements

2006
1000km Spa-Francorchamps: 2nd overall (2nd LMP1)
1000 km Donington: 5th overall (4th LMP1)
1000 km Jarama: 3rd overall (2nd LMP1)
1000 km Okayama : 1st overall (1st LMP1)
24 Hours of Le Mans 2006: no car finished

2007
1000 km Monza: 5th overall (5th LMP1)
1000km Okayama: 1st overall (1st LMP1)
24 Hours of Le Mans: 26th overall (12th LMP1)

2008
1000 km Monza: 6th overall (6th LMP1)
1000 km Spa: 3rd overall (3rd LMP1)
Nürburgring 1000 km race: 6th overall (6th LMP1)
1000 km Silverstone: 8th overall (7th LMP1)
2008 24 Hours of Le Mans: 8th overall (8th LMP1)
Le Mans Series 2008: 6th Constructors' Championship LMP1

Design
The vehicle was developed in accordance with the ACO and FIA rules applicable in 2005 so that it is eligible to start in all sports car races up to and including 2010. Courage officially unveiled the prototype at the 2006 Geneva Motor Show. The car has been designed to compete in both the LMP1 and LMP2 classes with minor modifications. The LC70 thus also forms the basis for the smaller sister car, the Courage-ORECA LC75 for the LMP2. The six-speed gearbox used comes from Xtrac. The engines are sourced from various suppliers such as AER, Mugen, or Judd.

For 2008 the aerodynamics of the LC70 has been significantly revised by ORECA. For example, the central air intake at the front was converted into two lateral ones in the wheel arches. In addition, the front spoiler has been heavily modified. The project by students from Tokai University brought further significant changes. They modified the entire aerodynamics and only adopted the underbody and monocoque for their Le Mans participation in 2008. They also used a YGK engine for the first time.

Chassis
All built chassis of the LC70 or the LC75 were numbered consecutively, since they are largely identical. So chassis 2 was converted from LC70 to type LC75. When Acura officially entered the American Le Mans Series in 2007, three LC75 chassis were purchased, but these were used as the Acura ARX-01a and in 2008 as the Acura ARX-01b. In 2008 another chassis was added for De Ferran Motorsports. The chassis were also further developed by Acura itself.

References

Le Mans Prototypes
24 Hours of Le Mans race cars
Rear-wheel-drive vehicles
Mid-engined cars
Sports prototypes
Cars of France
2000s cars
C60
Cars introduced in 2006